The Apostolic Prefecture of Shaowu is an apostolic prefecture located in the city of Shaowu (Fujian) that is immediately subject to the Holy See. On May 21, 1938, the Apostolic Vicariate of Jian'ou was established and placed under the care of the Salvatorians. In 1950, there were around 5112 faithful in the jurisdiction.

Leadership
 Inigo Maximilian König, S.D.S. (21 May 1938 appointed - 13 Aug 1964 died)
 Heribert Aloysius Theodor Winkler, S.D.S. (9 Jan 1930 - 21 May 1938 resigned)

References
 GCatholic
 Catholic Hierarchy

Roman Catholic dioceses in China
Christian organizations established in 1938
Roman Catholic dioceses and prelatures established in the 20th century
Christianity in Fujian